Telugu is a Unicode block containing characters for the Telugu, Gondi, and Lambadi languages of Telangana and Andhra Pradesh, India. In its original incarnation, the code points U+0C01..U+0C4D were a direct copy of the Telugu characters A1-ED from the 1988 ISCII standard. The Devanagari, Bengali, Gurmukhi, Gujarati, Oriya, Tamil, Kannada, and Malayalam blocks were similarly all based on their ISCII encodings.

Block

History
The following Unicode-related documents record the purpose and process of defining specific characters in the Telugu block:

References 

Unicode blocks